Peter Watson (born 3 March 1944) is a Northern Irish former football player and manager.

Playing career
Born in Coventry, England, Watson played as a striker for Bessbrook Wanderers, Newry Town, Aston Villa, Glenavon, Glentoran, Distillery, Dundalk, Portadown and Dungannon Swifts. He also earned one cap for the Northern Ireland national team, when he replaced Sammy Todd in the 88th minute of a 5–0 victory over Cyprus.

Coaching career
Watson served as player-manager of Dundalk (in a caretaker role) and Dungannon Swifts, and as manager at Newry City, Banbridge Town, Rathfriland Rangers and Lurgan Celtic.

References

1944 births
Living people
Association footballers from Northern Ireland
Northern Ireland international footballers
Newry City F.C. players
Aston Villa F.C. players
Glenavon F.C. players
Glentoran F.C. players
Lisburn Distillery F.C. players
Dundalk F.C. players
Portadown F.C. players
Dungannon Swifts F.C. players
NIFL Premiership players
League of Ireland players
Association football forwards
Football managers from Northern Ireland
Dundalk F.C. managers
Newry City F.C. managers